Paul Convert was a Belgian equestrian. He competed in three events at the 1912 Summer Olympics.

References

External links
 

Year of birth missing
Year of death missing
Belgian male equestrians
Olympic equestrians of Belgium
Equestrians at the 1912 Summer Olympics
Place of birth missing